Swatara Ferry House, also known as "Old Fort," is a historic home located at Middletown, Dauphin County, Pennsylvania. It is a -story log building with a full stone foundation and cellar, built in two sections.  It is believed to date to about 1820. 
It was added to the National Register of Historic Places in 1976.

References

Houses on the National Register of Historic Places in Pennsylvania
Houses completed in 1820
Houses in Dauphin County, Pennsylvania
National Register of Historic Places in Dauphin County, Pennsylvania